Sarah Beth Noriega (Sulentor) (born April 24, 1976) is an American indoor volleyball player, a collegiate champion, and an Olympic athlete.

High school
Noriega graduated in 1994 from Ulysses High School, in the small town of Ulysses, Kansas. There, she played on the volleyball team under coach Courtney Eslick, who described her as the best athlete he had ever coached. Though her high school team did not win any major championships, Noriega became a three-time WAC all-conference athlete, and, while playing for Ulysses High School, was a two-time all-state selection. She helped win Program-of-the-Year honors for her school for the 1992-93 season from the Kansas Volleyball Association.

Collegiate and beyond
She played for Loyola Marymount University from 1994 to 1997, helping lead the team to three consecutive WCC championships, and was named the 1997 West Coast Conference Player of the Year.

Noriega played with the US National team, participating in the 1995 U.S. Olympic Festival, the World Games, the 2000 Olympics, and the 2002 World Championships.

2000 Summer Olympics
At the 2000 Summer Olympics, Noriega played for the United States national team as an "outside position player." With her as a starting player, her team defeated the teams from China, Kenya and Croatia before facing the Australia team - with Noriega, by then, having competed in 108 international competitions and three world championships. Noreiga also participated in the USA defeat of teams from South Korea and Australia; however, two losses to Brazil and one to Russia pushed the team just outside the medals, ranking 4th in the 2000 Olympics.

Honors and awards

Collegiate
 1997 West Coast Conference (WCC) Player of the Year
 1997-98 school year: LMU's Female Athlete of the Year
 All-District VIII honoree (three times)
 AVCA First Team All-American
 Volleyball Magazine All-American
 1998 (February) Volleyball Magazine National Player of the Month
 All-West Coast Conference First Team selection (three-time)
 2007 (October 13) fifth volleyball player in LMU history to have her number retired
 2009 Loyola Marymount Hall of Fame

Other
 2000 U.S. Olympian
 2012 Kansas Volleyball Association Hall of Fame

Records and stats
NCAA records:
 Most kills in a four-set match (47 kills on November 7, 1997, against San Diego)
 1997-1998 Senior year: 614 kills, and led the nation with a kill average of 6.90

Loyola Marymount rankings, as of 2009: 
 second in kill average (4.71)
 third in attack percentage (.319)
 third in one-year kills (614)
 third in one-year kill average (6.90)
 fourth all-time in kills (1,446)

Extensive details on her performance stats are found at the Loyola Marymount Lions website, in the article about her induction to the LMU Hall of Fame.

References

1976 births
Living people
Olympic volleyball players of the United States
Volleyball players at the 2000 Summer Olympics
Loyola Marymount Lions women's volleyball players
Sportspeople from Kansas
American women's volleyball players
Pan American Games medalists in volleyball
Pan American Games bronze medalists for the United States
Medalists at the 1999 Pan American Games